The Wilsons is an album by a short-lived music group of the same name, consisting of Carnie Wilson and her sister Wendy Wilson, in collaboration with their father Brian Wilson of The Beach Boys.

History
After Wilson Phillips broke up in 1993, Carnie & Wendy Wilson continued to write and record together. They released a Christmas album together in 1993 titled Hey Santa!, which was the first album recorded by the Wilson sisters without Chynna Phillips. The album was a collection of classic holiday songs, with one original song (the title track). It was not a commercial success, although the single "Hey Santa!" still receives recurrent airplay during the Christmas holiday season.

Wendy and Carnie then joined with their estranged father Brian in 1997, and went on to release The Wilsons, which was critically successful, yet also commercially unsuccessful. A single "Monday Without You" was released in 1997, but failed to chart on Billboard's Top 100. Brian's collaborator Joe Thomas co-produced the track "Everything I Need". Session drummer Hal Blaine, who played on the recording, later said that Thomas ruined the song with excessive amounts of percussive flourishes: "I couldn't believe what I was hearing, what they did to this beautiful [song]. It was like someone took a beautiful Ferrari and beat the crap out of it with a sledgehammer. ... Some guys will get hold of Brian and talk him into anything."

Carnie and Wendy joined Beach Boy Al Jardine in 1998, for three years of live performances, and a live album in 2001, Al Jardine's Family and Friends Live in Las Vegas. The Wilson sisters reunited with Chynna Phillips in 2001 to perform live at a tribute show to Brian Wilson, and in 2004 to release California, an album of cover songs. They reunited again in 2012 for the album Dedicated, which included covers of hit songs by The Mamas & the Papas and The Beach Boys. Also in 2012, Carnie and Wendy Wilson joined with the children of other Beach Boys' members to form the vocal group California Saga, which performed during the intermission for The Beach Boys' 50th-anniversary show in June at the Hollywood Bowl.

Track listing
 "Monday Without You" (Carole King, Mark Hudson, Paul Brady) - (3:55) *
 "Good About You" (4:27)
 "Miracle" (5:55) *
 "Goddess' Revival" (4:16)
 "Candy" (4:51)
 "'Til I Die" (3:22) *
 "St. Joan" (4:08)
 "Open Door" (4:03)
 "I Hate Your Face" (4:26)
 "Everything" (3:28)
 "Not Your Average Girl" (4:08)
 "Everything I Need" (3:29) *
 "Pretty Poison" (4:32) - bonus track on "Monday Without You" single
 "All This Madness" (4:30) - bonus track on "Monday Without You" single

Songs with an asterisk include Brian Wilson.

References

External links
 
 The Wilsons official website

1997 debut albums
The Wilsons albums
Albums produced by Brian Wilson
Albums produced by Joe Thomas (producer)
Albums produced by David A. Stewart
PolyGram albums